My Father is a 2007 South Korean film. The film, which is based on a true story, is about an adopted son who is searching for his biological parents in South Korea. During his search he meets his real father, a condemned murderer on death row. Daniel Henney plays the lead role of James, who works as an army captain in the United States Forces Korea. He asks questions of why his father is on death row and finds out things that he always wanted to know. Then he finds more and more truths unravel about his father and his life.

The release of the film inspired controversy because the family of the father's victims did not support its production. In its first week on release it topped the South Korean box office sales charts.

The adopted son on whom the story is based is Aaron Bates, an insurance broker who lives and works in Arizona with his wife and two sons. In real life, a DNA test confirmed that the man he met on death row was not his biological father.

Cast
 Kim Yeong-cheol as Hwang Nam-cheol
 Daniel Henney as James Parker
 Ahn Suk-hwan as Jang Min-ho
 Richard Riehle as John Parker 
 Ilene Graff as  Nancy Parker
 Kim In-kwon as Shin Yo-seob
 Choi Jong-ryul as Moon Shin-bu
 Jeon Guk-hwan as Kim
 Lee Sang-hee as Park
 Son Jin-hwan as Thief
 Bae Ho-geun as Hyeon-shik
 Bak Gyeong-geun as Haeng Sang-nam

References

External links
 https://web.archive.org/web/20120504150051/http://www.myfather2007.co.kr/
 
  
 

2007 films
2000s Korean-language films
South Korean drama films
Films about the United States Army
English-language South Korean films
2000s South Korean films